Mark Mateschitz (born May 1990) is an Austrian billionaire. He owns 49% of Red Bull GmbH, the energy-drink company that was co-founded by his father, Dietrich Mateschitz.

References

1992 births
Austrian billionaires
Living people